The United Arab Emirates national cricket team toured Nepal in November 2022 to play three One Day International (ODI) matches. All the three matches were played in Tribhuvan University International Cricket Ground. The series provided Nepal with preparation for a tri-series in Namibia in December 2022, part of Cricket World Cup League 2.

The hosts were outplayed in the first ODI, falling to a defeat by 84 runs. Nepal levelled the series by winning the second ODI by three wickets, with a 62-run stand between Aarif Sheikh and Gulsan Jha for the seventh wicket helping them recover from a top order collapse. Nepal won the third ODI by 6 wickets, Aasif Sheikh scoring 88 not out in the successful chase, to seal their first victory in a home bilateral ODI series.

Squads

ODI series

1st ODI

2nd ODI

3rd ODI

References

External links
 Series home at ESPNcricinfo

2022 in Nepalese cricket
2022 in Emirati cricket
International cricket competitions in 2022–23